The Garden Conservancy is an American nonprofit organization whose mission is to preserve, share, and celebrate America's gardens and diverse gardening traditions for the education and inspiration of the public.

Founded in 1989, by Frank Cabot, the Conservancy has since helped a number of American gardens to develop preservation strategies, organizational structures, and funding plans. In some cases, the Conservancy takes the lead in transitioning the garden to a sustainable, nonprofit status. The Garden Conservancy is headquartered in Cold Spring, New York.

History
During a visit to Ruth Bancroft's garden in Walnut Creek, California, Frank Cabot asked Bancroft what would happen to the garden after her death. Cabot's wife suggested the establishment of a nonprofit organization for garden preservation, and the idea for the Conservancy was born. Cabot founded the organization in 1989. The first garden the Garden Conservancy opened to the public was the Ruth Bancroft Garden, which began tours in 1992 and officially became a nonprofit in 1994.

Gardens
Projects include:

 Alcatraz Island, San Francisco, California
 The Ruth Bancroft Garden, Walnut Creek, California
 The Chase Garden, Orting, Washington
 The Fells, the John Hay National Wildlife Refuge, Newbury, New Hampshire
 Greenwood Gardens, Short Hills, New Jersey
 The John P. Humes Japanese Stroll Garden, Mill Neck, New York
 Montrose, Hillsborough, North Carolina
 Peckerwood Garden, Hempstead, Texas
 Rocky Hills, Mount Kisco, New York
 George Schoellkopf’s garden, Washington, Connecticut
 Steepletop, Austerlitz, New York
 Van Vleck House and Gardens, Montclair, New Jersey
 Yew Dell Gardens, Crestwood, Kentucky

See also

Historic garden conservation

References

The Garden Conservancy, June 2020, #OpenDay25: A Quarter Century of America's Gardeners and Their Gardens,

External links
 

.
Horticultural organizations based in the United States
.
Nature conservation organizations based in the United States
Landscape architecture organizations
Environmental organizations established in 1989
1989 establishments in the United States
Non-profit organizations based in New York (state)